The Refugio County Courthouse, at 808 Commerce in Refugio, Texas, is a courthouse which was listed on the National Register of Historic Places in 2002.

It was built in 1917 in a Mission style design by architect Atlee B. Ayres.  It was greatly enlarged and renovated in 1951 into a Moderne style design by Irving H. Dunbar.

The listing included the courthouse, as a contributing building and also two contributing objects. One is a 1936 historical marker provided by the Texas Highway Department as part of Texas's Centennial celebration.

See also

National Register of Historic Places listings in Refugio County, Texas
List of county courthouses in Texas

References

External links

National Register of Historic Places in Refugio County, Texas
Courthouses on the National Register of Historic Places in Texas
Moderne architecture in the United States
Buildings and structures completed in 1951